DU–Teššup was the son of Aziru, of the 1350–1335 BC  Amarna letters correspondence, and also the father of Aziru's successor, in Amurru (regional Syria). DU-Teššup's name refers to the Hurrian god of sky and storm, Teshub.

Aziru, and his father Abdi-Ashirta, were some of the major instigating forces (in the north) causing conflict with the Egyptian pharaoh, as cities ('city-states'), and regions were under constant threat and destruction in the northern, and western Canaan region (Lebanon, and southern Syria).

DU–Teššup is the presumed author of tablet-letter EA 169-(EA is for 'el Amarna') written to pharaoh, requesting Aziru's return from "forced"
consultation. DU–Teššup is not mentioned by name in the Amarna letters corpus.

History
Aziru was called to Egypt to explain his actions: bad, and good. Aziru wrote, as did his father Abdi-Ashirta, that he was protecting his regions. All the letters from both Aziru and Abdi Ashirta reflect: "the middle conflict", allegiance to pharaoh to the south (northeast Egypt), control and protection (calling 'to guard') the local cities (and their rulers), in northern Canaan, and personal aspirations of total control, and their personal aggrandizement. (This probably partially led to Abdi-Ashirta's death and removal from the scene, but since his son Aziru became the major player, Abdi-Ashirta's age can also be presumed.)

The Amarna letter–(169)

EA 169, title: "Aziru in Egypt"
With introduction damaged, etc.:

[...may all g]o well.
[In me] there is no . ... may keep me alive [and] you may put me to death. To you alone do I look, and you alone are my lord. So may my lord heed his servants. Do not delay Aziru, your servant, there (any longer). Send him here immediately so he may guard the countries-(KUR-MEŠ(lands)) of the king, our lord.Moreover, to Tutu, my lord: "Hear the words of the kings of Nuhašše". They said to me: "You sold your father [t]o the king of Egypt-(named: Mizri) for gold, and w[he]n will he-(pharaoh) let him go from Egypt?" All the country and all the Sutean forces said to me, also to that point,—"Aziru is not going to get out of Egypt." And now the Suteans are deserting the country [and I am] repeatedly informed, "Your father is staying [i]n Eg[yp]t, [and so] we are going to wage war against you."... ...Listen, [my lord. Tut]u, my lord, [let] Aziru go [immediately. ...] ... ...[Now indeed ever]one is d[eser]ting.  -EA 169, lines 3–47 (many lacunae)

Besides Pharaoh, Tutu, the Egyptian official is addressed. The local Suteans (mercenaries, etc.?) and the region of Nuhašše are also the subject of this letter.

See also
Tutu (Egyptian official)
Amarna letters–localities and their rulers
Suteans
Nuhašše

References
Moran, William L. The Amarna Letters.'' Johns Hopkins University Press, 1987, 1992. (softcover)

Canaanite people
Amarna letters writers
14th-century BC people